Sleumerodendron is a monotypic genus of plant in the family Proteaceae. The sole species is Sleumerodendron austrocaledonicum.

This species is endemic to New Caledonia. It is closely related to Turrillia (Vanuatu, Fiji) and Kermadecia (New Caledonia), where it has once been placed.

References

Proteaceae
Monotypic Proteaceae genera
Endemic flora of New Caledonia
Taxa named by Robert Virot
Taxa named by Adolphe-Théodore Brongniart
Taxa named by Jean Antoine Arthur Gris